Balki Bartokomous is a fictional character played by Bronson Pinchot in the television sitcom Perfect Strangers. He is from the fictional island of Mypos, which is near Greece and is based on Greek culture.

Character history 
Pinchot was first approached by producers Tom Miller and Robert Boyett to play the role of an immigrant to the United States in a show tentatively titled "The Greenhorn." He initially refused, not wanting to play another character similar to "Serge"—his role in Beverly Hills Cop, who also has an unusual accent. He reconsidered after returning from a trip to Greece and decided to base the character and the fictional island of Mypos on the people he encountered in the villages of Greece. Pinchot came up with the name Balki, after his sister's dog that she named "Balcony" and ended up calling him "Balcy" for short.

Personality 
Balki was born and raised on the fictional Greek-like island of Mypos, where he eked out a living as a shepherd and dreamed of a better life in the United States. Balki is a naive, optimistic, well-meaning person. Pinchot once said of his character, "...he looks at the world like a four-year-old [and] sees the world as benevolent". The traits, along with his ignorance of American culture, sometimes get Balki into difficult or dangerous situations, with his cousin Larry Appleton invariably coming to his rescue. However, Larry soon realizes that for all of Balki's naivety and cultural malapropisms, he otherwise is a very intelligent and courageous man of many talents who often saves the day himself.

Mypos, as described by Balki, was a somewhat strange land, with many bizarre customs and traditions. One episode had Larry going duck hunting and the normally gentle Balki surprisingly asks to come along, out of intense hatred for ducks, which are regarded as vicious predators on Mypos. The description he gives of the ducks on Mypos later in the episode, however, implies that in fact Archaeopteryx still exists on the island. It is also described as being something of a primitive, backward place, with Larry once mentioning that the whole country had just one telephone (with call-waiting) and only the royal family had indoor plumbing.

Balki's keen sheep-keeping skills come up a few times, particularly in the fifth-season episode "The Selling of Mypos". In the episode, King Ferdinand sends Balki the Hat of a Thousand Quibbles, in order to negotiate the sale of Myposian land to an American company. Balki saved the island from potential ruin when he realized they wanted the land for a toxic waste dump, so he did not let the sale go through, passing up a hefty negotiator's fee for him and Larry. Balki has a stuffed sheep named Dimitri. In the seventh season episode "Dimitri's World", Larry and Balki begin writing a cartoon strip for the Chicago Chronicle based on his stuffed sheep. Balki reveals that the stuffed sheep is made from the wool of a sheep also named Dimitri, who died saving him from being run over by a carriage. Dimitri is dressed and posed in a way to reflect what is going on. For example, in the episode "Falling in Love is...", Balki puts out a bowl of wax lips for his date with Carol, throughout the episode, Dimitri also wears a pair of wax lips. Also in season 7, Dimitri's picture is seen on their mantel.

Relationship to other characters 
When the series began, Balki arrived in America to live with his distant cousin Larry Appleton, carrying his meager possessions in a trunk quaintly labeled "America or Burst". A scene depicting this trunk is shown during the opening credits throughout the run of the show, although it was somewhat shortened from season 3 on.  In the first scene of the pilot, he appears on his Cousin Larry's doorstep in Chicago, explaining that he had gone to Madison, Wisconsin to find Larry, only to find he had just moved to Chicago. The pilot to Perfect Strangers was originally filmed with comedian Louie Anderson as the Cousin Larry character; however the role was recast with Mark Linn-Baker playing the part, and the original pilot never aired.

Balki is very close to his mother, whom he calls "Mamma", and talks about her regularly throughout the series. She was an unseen character until she appeared in the season 7 episode (Citizenship), but Balki spoke of her often in the series. In "Citizenship", Balki's mother (also played by Pinchot) came to the United States to see Balki become an American citizen (though due to a mistranslation on Larry's part, Balki's mother originally thought she was coming to see Balki get his driver's license). When Balki's mother learned that he was becoming an American citizen, she was hurt because she had hoped that Balki would return to Mypos. Balki's mother gave Balki a "chicken foot" with a missing toe, which meant that unless he did what his mother wished, Balki was no longer her son. Balki returned to Mypos, and Larry followed him to convince Balki's mother to let Balki return to the United States. Balki did so and became an American citizen. Balki has also mentioned Uncle Stavros many times in the series.

In a season 2 episode (Hunks Like Us), Balki met his girlfriend Mary Anne Spencer at a health club. They eventually get married in the season 7 finale. In the first part of the series finale (Up, Up, and Away), Mary Anne gave birth to their son, Robespierre-Boinki Bartokomous.

Sam Gorpley (Balki's employer for seasons 3-7) was often abusive toward Balki. Gorpley initially planned to hire his nephew to work in the mail room but was not available immediately so the editor Harry Burns gave Balki the job. This made Gorpley try to find an excuse to fire Balki so he could give the job to his nephew.

Occupation 
Many scenes of Perfect Strangers took place in Larry and Balki's workplace. In the pilot (Knock Knock... Who's There), Larry got Balki a job at the Ritz Discount store, where he was already employed. They worked for Donald Twinkacetti for the first two seasons.  In season 3, after Larry got a job at the Chicago Chronicle, Balki began working for the mailroom for the chronicle. Larry and Balki both worked in the same room in the basement of the chronicle. Balki worked for Sam Gorpley who regularly insulted Balki. In the season 7 episode (Dimitri's World), Balki and Larry are promoted at the Chicago Chronicle. The two of them worked together writing Dimitri's World, a comic strip about Balki's beloved sheep. They worked on another floor after their promotion so this meant a new setting for scenes set in their workplace, but the room in the basement was still occasionally used in later episodes.

A few episodes of the series focused on Balki's education. In the first two seasons, Balki mentioned attending night school to earn his high school diploma. His graduation was the plot of the season 3 episode "The Graduate", where he was valedictorian. The season 4 episode College Bound was a flashback episode based on the characters discussing whether Larry's guidance for Balki has been good or bad while waiting to hear if Balki has been accepted into Chicago City College. At the end of the episode, Balki said he had been accepted. In the episode "Teacher's Pest" toward the end of season 4, Balki took a journalism class taught by Larry. The plot of the season 6 episode "See How They Run" was his unsuccessful campaign for student body president.

The Dance of Joy 
In the show, whenever Balki is immensely pleased by something, he does the "Dance of Joy" with Larry. It is always preceded by Balki exclaiming, "Now, that we are so happy, we do the dance of joy!" The dance consists of leg kicks, jumping and alternating chants of "Hey," ending with Larry jumping into Balki's arms.

Catchphrases 
Balki's favorite sayings include "Well, of course not; don't be ridiculous!" and "Get out of the city!".  He also has a habit of creating "Balki-isms" in which he slightly mangles common American idioms and slang.

References

Television characters introduced in 1986
Fictional immigrants to the United States
Fictional characters from Chicago
Television sidekicks
Fictional Greek people in television
Fictional shepherds